New Weston is a village in Darke County, Ohio, United States. The population was 136 at the 2010 census.

New Weston is home to the Eldora Speedway, a half-mile clay oval race track.

History
New Weston was founded in the 1880s during the construction of a railroad line through Allen Township by a predecessor of the Cincinnati, Jackson and Mackinaw Railroad.  It was one of the last communities to be founded in Darke County.

Geography
New Weston is located at  (40.336842, -84.644763).

Demographics

2010 census
As of the census of 2010, there were 136 people, 45 households, and 33 families living in the village. The racial makeup of the village was 97.8% White, 1.5% African American, and 0.7% from two or more races. Hispanic or Latino of any race were 5.1% of the population.

There were 45 households, of which 48.9% had children under the age of 18 living with them, 51.1% were married couples living together, 17.8% had a female householder with no husband present, 4.4% had a male householder with no wife present, and 26.7% were non-families. 20.0% of all households were made up of individuals, and 2.2% had someone living alone who was 65 years of age or older. The average household size was 3.02 and the average family size was 3.58.

The median age in the village was 28 years. 38.2% of residents were under the age of 18; 5.2% were between the ages of 18 and 24; 31.6% were from 25 to 44; 17.6% were from 45 to 64; and 7.4% were 65 years of age or older. The gender makeup of the village was 51.5% male and 48.5% female.

2000 census
As of the census of 2000, there were 135 people, 48 households, and 33 families living in the village. The population density was 528.0 people per square mile (200.5/km2). There were 52 housing units at an average density of 203.4 per square mile (77.2/km2). The racial makeup of the village was 97.78% White, and 2.22% from two or more races.

There were 48 households, out of which 35.4% had children under the age of 18 living with them, 56.3% were married couples living together, 6.3% had a female householder with no husband present, and 31.3% were non-families. 29.2% of all households were made up of individuals, and 8.3% had someone living alone who was 65 years of age or older. The average household size was 2.81 and the average family size was 3.27.

In the village, the population was spread out, with 31.9% under the age of 18, 9.6% from 18 to 24, 28.9% from 25 to 44, 20.0% from 45 to 64, and 9.6% who were 65 years of age or older. The median age was 30 years. For every 100 females, there were 107.7 males. For every 100 females age 18 and over, there were 109.1 males.

The median income for a household in the village was $38,333, and the median income for a family was $39,375. Males had a median income of $30,313 versus $19,375 for females. The per capita income for the village was $13,270. There were 8.1% of families and 12.6% of the population living below the poverty line, including 16.7% of under eighteens and none of those over 64.

References

Villages in Ohio
Villages in Darke County, Ohio